Blaine Kelly is a Gaelic footballer who plays for the St Mary's club and for the Dublin county team. He has already played a few times in the National Football League for Dublin and made his Championship debut against Meath in June 2009.

He won a Leinster football title in 2009.

References

Year of birth missing (living people)
Living people
Dublin inter-county Gaelic footballers
St Mary's (Dublin) Gaelic footballers